Ivan Boyadzhiev (born 12 July 1938) is a Bulgarian former football defender.

References

1938 births
Living people
Bulgarian footballers
Association football defenders
FC Lokomotiv 1929 Sofia players
PFC Lokomotiv Plovdiv players
First Professional Football League (Bulgaria) players
People from Sevlievo